In tennis, a bagel is when the set ends with a score of 6–0. An extremely rare type of bagel, where no point is lost, is called a golden set. Most bagel sets occur in the early rounds of tennis tournaments where the favorites play lower-ranked players, such as lucky losers or wild cards.

Etymology 
The term refers to the similarity between the shape of a zero and the shape of a bagel. The tennis term was coined by player Harold Solomon, and popularized by commentator Bud Collins.

Surface disparity 
Statistics of the men's singles Grand Slam tournaments from 2000 to 2016 are as follows: at Wimbledon (grass surface), 127 bagels were made; at French Open (clay surface), 267; at the US Open Tennis Championship (hard surface), 275, and at the Australian Open (hard surface), 238.. Björn Borg (five-time Wimbledon champion and six-time French Open champion) recorded 20 6–0 sets at the French Open, and only 5 at Wimbledon.

Double bagel

Women's singles 
For women in Grand Slam tournaments, a double bagel result is possible as the matches are best of three sets. In the Open Era, there has been a women's singles Grand Slam tournament match with a double bagel every year except for in 1968 and 2005. The most double bagels were in the seasons of 1974 and 1993, when eight matches had a result of 6–0, 6–0.

The following players had at least five double-bagels in Grand Slam singles events:

Between No. 1 ranked players

Men

Women

Triple bagel 

  = also won the tournament.

Records

Grand Slam tournaments

Men's singles 
In the history of the Grand Slam tournaments in the men's single category, the largest number of 6–0 sets won is the following:

At individual majors the players with the most 6–0 sets are:
 Australian Championship: 1. R. Federer – 17; 2. Jack Crawford (Australia) – 16; 3. A. Agassi; N. Djokovic – 15
 French Open: 1. R. Nadal – 24; 2–3. B. Borg, G. Vilas – 20 each; 4–5. Jaroslav Drobný (Czechoslovakia / Egypt), R. Lacoste – 17 each.
 Wimbledon: 1. R. Emerson – 15; 2–3. J. Connors, B. Tilden – to 12.
 US Championship: 1. J. Connors – 22; 2–3. I. Lendl, B. Tilden – 20 each.

Australian Neale Fraser won at least one 6–0 set in 16 Grand Slam tournaments in a row: starting with the 1957 Australian Championship and ending with the 1960 US championship.

Women's singles 
In the women's singles, the largest number of 6–0 sets won:

In individual tournaments of the Grand Slam, the largest number of 6–0 sets won is:
 Australian Championship: 1. M. Court – 25; 2. M. Sharapova – 16; 3. S. Williams – 14.
 French Open: 1. C. Evert – 26; 2. A. Sanchez – 22; 3. G. Sabatini – 21.
 Wimbledon: 1–2. Suzanne Lenglen (France), C. Evert – to 29; 3. M. Court – 25.
 US Championship: 1. C. Evert – 43; H. Wills-Moody – 31; 3. M. Court – 27.

All tournaments

Men's singles

Trivia
In 1910 in Bruxelles Max Decugis beat Tony Wilding 3–6, 0–6, 7–5, 6–0, 6–0. Wilding was winning 6–3, 6–0, 5–0.
In 1948 Don Budge won the first match against George Hudson 6–0, 6–0, 6–0 at the US Professional Championship, and against Jerome Adler 6–0, 6–0, 6–1 in the second round.
 In 1969, in the second round of Wimbledon, top seed Rod Laver began with the loss of the first two sets to the unseeded Indian Premjit Lall. However, the game ended in his favor with a score of 3–6, 4–6, 6–3, 6–0, 6–0.
 There are five cases in the history of tennis (two of which occurred in the French Open in one tournament), when the winner of the match lost 2 bagel sets:
 1935 (U.S. Pro Tennis Championship) Bill Tilden – Karel Koželuh 0–6, 6–1, 6–4, 0–6, 6–4 
 1962 (Tasmanian Championship) Rod Laver – Neale Fraser 7–5, 0–6, 0–6, 6–1, 6–2
 1969 (French Open) Stanley Matthews – Ilie Nastase 6–3, 0–6, 0–6, 6–4, 8–6
 1969 (French Open) Dennis Ralston – Patricio Rodríguez 6–2, 6–4, 0–6, 0–6, 6–4
 1981 (US Open) José Luis Clerc – Mel Purcell 6–3, 0–6, 0–6, 6–4, 6–3
 In 1981, in the first round of the US championship Jimmy Connors, who in the mid-70s almost married Chris Evert, beat her then-husband John Lloyd  with a score of 6–0, 6–0, 6–2.
Suzanne Lenglen won 9 tournaments in which she did not lose a single game in all matches.
Guillermo Vilas won 2 matches with a score of 6–0, 6–0 in 2 consecutive seasons (1980 and 1981).
Björn Borg won 116 6–0 sets during his career 
 Two women's finals in the history of the Grand Slam tournaments have ended with a double-bagel:
 1911 (Wimbledon) Dorothea Lambert-Chambers – Dora Boothby 6–0, 6–0
 1988 (French Open) Steffi Graf – Natasha Zvereva 6–0, 6–0
 Swiss tennis player Martina Hingis achieved her first Olympic bagel in singles in 1996, and the second in doubles twenty years later.
 Spanish tennis player Conchita Martínez scored the first double bagel against a player inside the top ten in Hamburg in 1995 when she defeated Magdalena Maleeva.
Polish tennis player Iga Świątek scored the first double bagel in a WTA 1000 final, defeating top ten Czech player, and former world number 1, Karolína Plíšková in Rome.

References

Tennis terminology
Tennis records and statistics